William of Durham (died 1249) is said to have founded University College, Oxford, England. He most likely came from Sedgefield, County Durham and was educated at Wearmouth monastery and in Paris, France.

William of Durham was archdeacon of Caux and (in 1235, for a few months) archbishop-elect of Rouen in Normandy, France.

When, in 1229, riots broke out in Paris, he may have been the leader of a group of students who migrated from that city to Oxford, but this tradition is not attested to by contemporary sources. What is more certain is that he held several rich benefices in England and died in Rouen, in 1249.

He left 310 marks, a large amount of money, in his will to be invested in rents that would support scholars in Oxford. This benefaction resulted in one of the first of the Oxford halls or colleges. Subsequently, this foundation took the name of University College.

Legacy
University College, Oxford now has a William of Durham Club for old members leaving a legacy to the College.

References

Year of birth missing
1249 deaths
People from Sedgefield
13th-century scholars
Christian scholars
People associated with University College, Oxford
Archdeacons of Durham
Founders of colleges of the University of Oxford